The Roald Dahl Children's Gallery is a children's museum that uses characters and themes from the books of Roald Dahl to stimulate children's interest in science, history and literature.

It is located on Church Street, Aylesbury, Buckinghamshire, England  and was opened on 23 November 1996 by Terence Hardiman, an actor popular with children due to his role as the titular role in The Demon Headmaster. The building was previously a coach-house.

The Roald Dahl theme is emphasised by the use of Quentin Blake graphical elements. Blake, a celebrated children's author and illustrator, is strongly associated with Dahl through his covers and illustrations for almost all modern UK editions of Dahl's books.

The museum has won two major awards for education. Aylesbury hosts the Roald Dahl Festival, a procession of giant puppets based on his characters, on 2 July.

See also
 Buckinghamshire County Museum, within the same complex as the Children's Gallery
 Roald Dahl Museum and Story Centre — which possesses Roald Dahl's manuscripts

References

External links 
 Roald Dahl Children's Gallery

Museums established in 1996
Museums in Buckinghamshire
Aylesbury
Children's museums in the United Kingdom
Dahl, Roald, Children's Gallery
Literary museums in England
1996 establishments in England
Roald Dahl